Staphylococcus auricularis is a Gram-positive member of the bacterial genus Staphylococcus consisting of pairs or tetrads of cocci.  This species was originally isolated from the exterior of a human ear and is weakly hemolytic.  Because it commonly exists on human skin, it may be able to cause opportunistic infections or sepsis, although this is very rare.

References

External links
Type strain of Staphylococcus auricularis at BacDive -  the Bacterial Diversity Metadatabase

auricularis
Bacteria described in 1983